Argyria sericina is a moth in the family Crambidae. It was described by Philipp Christoph Zeller in 1881. It is found in Colombia.

References

Argyriini
Moths of South America
Lepidoptera of Colombia
Moths described in 1881
Taxa named by Philipp Christoph Zeller